Pinoy Big Brother: Teen Edition 4 is the fourth teen edition and the tenth series overall of Pinoy Big Brother. The show premiered on April 8, 2012, almost a week after the Unlimited season concluded, and ended on July 7, 2012, replacing Nasaan Ka, Elisa?, lasting for 13 weeks, making it the longest teen edition yet. Toni Gonzaga, Bianca Gonzalez and Robi Domingo reprised their roles as hosts. They are joined by Pinoy Big Brother: Celebrity Edition 1 ex-housemate John Prats.

Auditions were held in major key cities in the Philippines and other parts of the world. A total of 22,305 teens auditioned for the season. Fourteen housemates entered this season, nine on opening night and six on Day 2.

Myrtle Sarrosa of Barotac Nuevo, Iloilo emerged as the winner of the season.

Overview

House theme
The House for this season remains largely unchanged since Unlimited, except for total redecoration spanning a week since the previous edition's finale. This marked the franchise's fastest House makeover. Visibly so far, there are only five areas of the House: the House itself, the garden, the activity area, a secret hallway leading into Big Brother's Time Machine, and Big Brother's Conference Room.  The House is decorated with various items from on the 1970s and 1980s, such as old vinyl records on the walls which Big Brother said that it was inspired by his own teenage life.

Edition twists
2-in-1 Housemates: Two housemates who are related biologically or by other means, are joined as one competing housemate, assigned by Big Brother. The status of one would be the status of the other. On Day 71, a split of connections was cast, in which both of the twins survived. Their shared status remained for the rest of the season.
House Players: They enter the house to test the remaining official housemates through tasks set by Big Brother and the audience.
Power of One: The public may only vote once per day per mobile phone number.
Big Jump to the Big Night: Remaining housemates compete to have a sure slot in the finals.
 SE Voting System: The public is given the chance to vote to save or evict a housemate. The housemate with the lowest net votes, Save and Evict votes combined, is evicted. The system is to be used in the season finale.

Housemates
Nine housemates, an all-male line-up entered the house on Day 1.enter via the garden, hours before opening night to perform a special task for Big Brother. The second batch of six housemates, consisting of an all-female line-up, entered on Day 2 during the late-afternoon Über show. The ages indicated were the housemates' ages upon their entrance to the House.

Houseguests
Similar to the franchise's previous seasons, Big Brother invited guests to his house for special purposes.

Notable houseguest for this season were Luis Manzano, Vice Ganda, Angeline Quinto, Yeng Constantino, Sam Milby, John Prats, Robi Domingo and past winners, Kim Chiu, Melisa Cantiveros, Slater Young.

Weekly tasks

: The boys correctly matched all eight names.
: Team Blue Whale earned PHP16,830 & Team Sunny Side-Up got PHP18,630.
: The housemates committed eight mistakes.
: Tom was originally in Kit's team, but when Big Brother asked if the housemates wanted to change teams Tom decided to go to Ryan's team.
: This task spanned two weeks. Tom and Karen won Outstanding Performance and Best Performance respectively
: Although the housemates were organized by gender, house player Kim was assigned to the boys' group while the girls got Francis.
: The housemates only opened 98 out of 100 locks.

Nomination history
The housemate first mentioned in each nomination gets two points, while the second gets one point. The percentage of votes shown is the percentage of votes to save unless otherwise stated. Certain factors leading to each housemate's nomination, such as violating show rules against discussing nominations, are noted below.

On Day 70, it was announced right after the eviction night that evictions would now be done every Friday from the usual Saturday starting Day 76 until the last eviction night before the finale. Nomination nights are also moved to Monday from the usual Sunday starting Day 72. Changes of the program schedule were made to free up airtime for The X Factor Philippines. 

 Legend
Bold Italicized name Indicates that the housemate won the "Big Jump to the Big Night" and was saved from the last evictions; however was still included to be voted by the public for the Big 4.
  Automatic nomination (due to violation(s) committed, failure of task, reserved housemate evictions)
  Granted immunity (due to a successful completion of a "Secret Task", a challenge winner.)

: Before the nomination, Kit and Yves talked about giving points to certain housemates. As a punishment, the two competed in cleaning bed sheets dirtied by the girl housemates but they can only use their elbows and knees to brush the sheets. The loser will automatically get three nomination votes. In the end Kit won, resulting in Yves receiving three points. 
: Kit automatically nominated himself as punishment for his team building the weakest house in the Patibahayan weekly task.
: Alec, Roy, & Ryan talked about nominating the girl housemates one-by-one. Big Brother put the trio up for a basketball challenge and whoever fails will complete the list of this week's nominees. In the end Alec lost, resulting in his automatic nomination. 
: Myrtle reaped the automatic nomination for talking about not nominating Kit. On the other hand, Tom and Karen won Outstanding Performance and Best Performance respectively. As a reward one of which would either get a Luxury gift for loved ones and immunity. They mutually agreed that Karen will be granted Immunity. 
: Big Brother asked the two groups (boys and girls) to pick a housemate from the other group whom they want to automatically nominate. The girls chose no one while the boys chose Myrtle, thus being nominated for the week. Meanwhile, Karen won another Immunity challenge.
: Big Brother implemented the "Power of One" rule wherein the public may only vote once per day per Sim card. The percentage of votes of the top three housemates were not revealed on-air. The top three votes were simply attributed to Housemates A, B, and C.
: Big Brother implemented the "S-E Voting" system wherein the public may vote to save or evict (in this case, prevent from winning) a housemate. Like the previous regular season, votes are reset after the final eviction.

Big Jump to the Big Night
Carried over from Double Up, this season's Big Jump to the Big 4 twist consists of two parts.

Ex-housemates Voting
On Day 77, Big Brother asked the ex-housemates which three of the remaining housemates deserve to win the Big Jump. Even though the ex-housemates ranked their bets, each name mentioned only corresponds to one vote, regardless of ranking. PBB Double-Up Big Winner Melisa Cantiveros, who coincidentally received the Big Jump in her season, visited the House to announce which three housemates will move on to the endurance challenge.

Endurance Task
Alec,Myrtle and Roy were assigned to stay atop a slope and hold on to a cart weighed proportionate to their own body weight. Alec was the first housemate to give up at five hours, while Mariz lasted for roughly seven hours. Roy held on to the cart for eight hours and six minutes, ensuring his Big Four qualification.

B.F.F. at the Big Night
On July 7, 2012, 91 days after the season started, the B.F.F. (Big Fantastic Finale) at the Big Night took place at the Malolos Sports and Convention Center in Bulacan . Prior to the Big Night, on the tenth Eviction Night, three special mechanics for the Big Night voting were announced. All votes were reset back to zero while the SE Voting System, which was last used in Unlimited'''s fourth eviction night, will be activated in lieu of the Power of One rule.

Myrtle Sarrosa of Barotac Nuevo, Iloilo was proclaimed the winner who garnered 33.92% of total net votes. Karen Reyes placed second garnering 11.91% of total net votes, while Roy Requejo placed third with 9.38% of total net votes. Mariz Raneses placed fourth after garnering 9.26% of total net votes.

S–E voting system result
Below is the eviction voting result implemented on the big night.

Immediately after Pinoy Big Brother Teen Edition 4

They introduced to their first teleserye Kahit Puso'y Masugatan''

References

External links
Official Website

 (Uber 2012)

2012 Philippine television seasons